Jere Shea (born June 14, 1965) is an American actor. He is best known for originating the role of Giorgio in the Broadway production of Passion, for which he received a nomination for the Tony Award for Best Actor in a Musical. Shea left acting in 1998 in order to spend more time with his family, working as deputy chief of staff to Massachusetts Governor Paul Cellucci among other positions. He returned to acting in a 2016 concert production of The Secret Garden. He starred in the 2019 Showtime series City on a Hill.

Theatre credits

References

External links 

 
 
 

1965 births
Living people
American male musical theatre actors
American male stage actors
American male television actors
Male actors from Boston
20th-century American male actors
21st-century American male actors